Topmodel, season 1 was the first season of the reality series Topmodel hosted by Ingrid Seynhaeve. Ten contestants lived together in a luxurious apartment until the top three travelled to New York City for the rest of the season.

In contrast to America's Next Top Model, the host was not part of the judging panel. Ghislaine Nuytten was the judging chairwoman and called out the girls onto the next round at the judging panel. The bottom two contestants were then officially nominated for elimination, with Marc Douchez from Dominique Models having the final say on who went home and who stayed.

The winner was Hanne Baekelandt, who won a €25,000 modeling contract for management and representation by Dominique Models, a campaign for L'Oréal cosmetics, and the cover on  magazine.

Contestants
(ages stated are at start of contest)

Summaries

Call-out order

 The contestant was eliminated
 The contestant won the competition

Judges
  (Head judge)
 Lieve Gerrits
 Marc Dochez
 Vasko Todorof

Coaches
  (actress & presenter)
 Elise Crombez (top model)
 Ingrid Seynhaeve (top model)
 Monique Vanendert (photographer)

References

Belgium
2007 Belgian television seasons